Ivan III Vasilyevich (22 January 1440 – 27 October 1505), also known as Ivan the Great, was the Grand Prince of Moscow and the Sovereign of all Rus'. Ivan served as the co-ruler and regent for his blind father Vasily II from the mid-1450s before he officially ascended the throne in 1462.

He multiplied the territory of his state through war and through the seizure of lands from his dynastic relatives, ended the dominance of the Tatars over Russia, renovated the Moscow Kremlin, introduced a new legal code, and laid the foundations of the centralized Russian state. His victory over the Great Horde in 1480 is often cited as the restoration of Russian independence, 240 years after the fall of Kiev in the Mongol invasion of Kievan Rus'.

Ivan was the first Russian ruler to style himself "tsar", albeit not as an official title. Through marriage to Sofia Paleologue, he made the double-headed eagle Russia's coat of arms and adopted the idea of Moscow as the third Rome. His 43-year reign was the second longest in Russian history, after that of his grandson Ivan IV.

Territorial expansion
Ivan's rule is marked by vastly expanding the territory of Moscow. Ivan brought the independent duchies (kniažestva) of different Rurikid princes under the direct control of Moscow, leaving the princes and their posterity without royal titles or land inheritance. His first enterprise was a war with the Republic of Novgorod, with which Muscovy (Moscow) as a Northern district of Golden Horde had fought a series of wars stretching back to at least the reign of Dmitry Donskoi. These wars were waged over Moscow's religious and political sovereignty, and over Moscow's efforts to seize land in the Northern Dvina region. Alarmed at the growing power of Moscow, Novgorod had negotiated with the Grand Duchy of Lithuania and Rus in the hope of placing itself under the protection of Casimir IV, King of Poland and Grand Prince of Lithuania, a would-be alliance that was proclaimed by the Moscow rulers as an act of apostasy from Orthodoxy (in part, because Poland and its monarchs were Catholic). Ivan took the field against Novgorod in 1470, and after his generals had twice defeated the forces of the republic – at the Battle of Shelon River and on the Northern Dvina, both in the summer of 1471 – the Novgorodians were forced to sue for peace, agreeing to abandon their overtures to Lithuania and to cede a considerable portion of their northern territories, while paying a war indemnity of 15,500 roubles.

Ivan visited Novgorod several times in the next several years, persecuting a number of pro-Lithuanian boyars and confiscating their lands. In 1477, two Novgorodian envoys, claiming to have been sent by the archbishops and the entire city, addressed Ivan in public audience as Gosudar (sovereign) instead of the usual Gospodin (sir). Ivan at once seized upon this as a recognition of his sovereignty, and when the Novgorodians repudiated the envoys (indeed, one was killed at the veche and several others of the pro-Moscow faction were killed with him) and swore openly in front of the Moscow ambassadors that they would turn to Lithuania again, he marched against them. Deserted by Casimir and surrounded on every side by the Moscow armies, which occupied the major monasteries around the city, Novgorod ultimately recognized Ivan's direct rule over the city and its vast hinterland in a document signed and sealed by Archbishop Feofil of Novgorod (1470–1480) on 15 January 1478.

Ivan dispossessed Novgorod of more than four-fifths of its land, keeping half for himself and giving the other half to his allies. Subsequent revolts (1479–1488) were punished by the removal en masse of the richest and most ancient families of Novgorod to Moscow, Vyatka, and other north-eastern Rus' cities. Archbishop Feofil was also removed to Moscow for plotting against the Grand Prince. The rival republic of Pskov owed the continuance of its own political existence to the readiness with which it assisted Ivan against its ancient enemy. The other principalities were eventually absorbed by conquest, purchase, or marriage contract: The Principality of Yaroslavl in 1463, Rostov in 1474, Tver in 1485, and Vyatka 1489.

Ivan's refusal to share his conquests with his brothers, and his subsequent interference with the internal politics of their inherited principalities, involved him in several wars with them, from which, though the princes were assisted by Lithuania, he emerged victorious. Finally, Ivan's new rule of government, formally set forth in his last will to the effect that the domains of all his kinsfolk, after their deaths, should pass directly to the reigning Grand Duke instead of reverting, as hitherto, to the princes' heirs, put an end once and for all to these semi-independent princelings.

Ivan had four brothers. The eldest, Yury, died childless on 12 September 1472. He only had a draft of a will that said nothing about his land. Ivan seized the land, much to the fury of the surviving brothers, whom he placated with some land. Boris and Andrei the Elder signed treaties with Vasily in February and September 1473. They agreed to protect each other's land and not to have secret dealings with foreign states; they broke this clause in 1480, fleeing to Lithuania. It is unknown whether Andrei the Younger signed a treaty. He died in 1481, leaving his lands to Ivan. In 1491 Andrei the Elder was arrested by Ivan for refusing to aid the Crimean Khanate against the Golden Horde. He died in prison in 1493, and Ivan seized his land. In 1494 Boris, the only brother able to pass his land to his sons, died. However, their land reverted to the Tsar upon their deaths in 1503 and 1515 respectively.

There was one semi-autonomous prince in Muscovy when Ivan acceded: Prince Mikhail Andreevich of Vereia, who had been awarded an Appanage by Vasily II. In 1478 he was pressured into giving Belozersk to Ivan, who got all of Mikhail's land on his death in 1486.

Domestic policy

The character of the government of Moscow changed significantly under Ivan III, taking on a new autocratic form. This was a natural consequence of the hegemony of Moscow over the other Vladimir-Suzdal lands, but also to new imperial pretensions. After the fall of Constantinople, orthodox canonists were inclined to regard the Grand Princes of Moscow, where the Orthodox Metropolitan of Kiev moved in 1325 after the Mongol Invasions, as the successors of the Byzantine emperors. Ivan himself appeared to welcome the idea, and he began to style himself tsar in foreign correspondence. The British historian J. L. I. Fennell emphasizes Ivan's success in centralizing control over local rulers; he adds, however, that his reign was also "a period of cultural depression and spiritual barrenness. Freedom was stamped out within the Muscovite lands. By his anti-Catholicism Ivan brought down the curtain between Muscovy and the west. For the sake of territorial aggrandizement he deprived his country of the fruits of Western learning and civilization."

This movement coincided with a change in the family circumstances of Ivan III. After the death of his first consort, Maria of Tver (1467), and at the suggestion of Pope Paul II (1469), who hoped thereby to bind Muscovy to the Holy See, Ivan III wedded Sophia Palaiologina (also known under her original name Zoe), daughter of Thomas Palaeologus, despot of Morea, who claimed the throne of Constantinople as the brother of Constantine XI, the last Byzantine emperor. Frustrating the Pope's hopes of reuniting the two faiths, the princess endorsed Eastern Orthodoxy. Due to her family traditions, she encouraged imperial ideas in the mind of her consort. It was through her influence that the ceremonious etiquette of Constantinople (along with the imperial double-headed eagle and all that it implied) was adopted by the court of Moscow.

Ivan's son with Maria of Tver, Ivan the Young, died in 1490, leaving from his marriage with Helen of Moldavia an only child, Dmitry the Grandson. The latter was crowned as successor by his grandfather on 15 February 1498, but later Ivan reverted his decision in favor of Sophia's elder son Vasily, who was ultimately crowned co-regent with his father (14 April 1502). The decision was dictated by the crisis connected with the Sect of Skhariya the Jew, as well as by the imperial prestige of Sophia's descendants. Dmitry the Grandson was put into prison, where he died, unmarried and childless, in 1509, already under the rule of his uncle.

The Grand Duke increasingly held aloof from his boyars. The old patriarchal systems of government vanished. The boyars were no longer consulted on affairs of state. The sovereign became sacrosanct, while the boyars were reduced to dependency on the will of the sovereign. The boyars naturally resented this revolution and struggled against it.

It was in the reign of Ivan III that the new Muscovite Sudebnik, or law code, was compiled by the scribe, Vladimir Gusev. Ivan did his utmost to make his capital a worthy successor to Constantinople, and with that object invited many foreign masters and artificers to settle in Moscow. The most noted of these was the Italian Ridolfo di Fioravante, nicknamed "Aristotle" because of his extraordinary knowledge, who built several cathedrals and palaces in the Kremlin, and also supervised the construction of the Kremlin walls.

Foreign policy
Muscovy rejected the Tatar yoke during the reign of Ivan III. In 1476, Ivan refused to pay the customary tribute to the grand Khan Ahmed, and in 1480 Ahmed Khan organized a military campaign against Muscovy.  Throughout the autumn the Muscovy and Tatar hosts confronted each other on opposite sides of the Ugra River, till 11 November 1480 when Ahmed retreated into the steppe.

In the following year the Grand Khan, while preparing a second expedition against Moscow, was suddenly attacked, routed and slain by Khan Ibak of the Nogai Horde, whereupon the Golden Horde suddenly fell to pieces. In 1487 Ivan reduced the khanate of Kazan, one of the offshoots of the Horde, to the condition of a vassal state, though in his later years it broke away from his suzerainty. With the other Muslim powers, the Khan of the Crimean Khanate and the sultans of Ottoman Empire, Ivan's relations were peaceful and even amicable. The Crimean Khan, Meñli I Giray, helped him against the Grand Duchy of Lithuania and facilitated the opening of diplomatic relations between Moscow and Constantinople, where the first Muscovian embassy appeared in 1495.

The Christian rulers in the Caucasus began to see the Muscovite monarchs as their natural allies against the Muslim regional powers. The first attempt at forging an alliance was made by Alexander I, king of a small Georgian kingdom of Kakheti, who dispatched two embassies, in 1483 and 1491, to Moscow. However, as the Muscovites were still too far from the Caucasus, neither of these missions had any effect on the course of events in the region. In 1488, Ivan sought gun founders, master gunners for siege cannons, gold and silversmiths, and Italian master builders from King Matthias Corvinus.

In Nordic affairs, Ivan III concluded an offensive alliance with John of Denmark and maintained regular correspondence with Emperor Maximilian I, who called him a "brother". He built a strong citadel in Ingria, named Ivangorod after himself, situated on the Russian-Estonian border, opposite the fortress of Narva held by the Livonian Confederation. In the Russo-Swedish War, Ivan III unsuccessfully attempted to conquer Vyborg from Sweden, but this attempt was checked by the Swedish garrison in Vyborg Castle led by Lord Knut Posse.

The further extension of the Moscow dominion was facilitated by the death of Casimir IV in 1492, when Poland and Lithuania once again parted company. The throne of Lithuania was now occupied by Casimir's son Alexander, a weak and lethargic prince so incapable of defending his possessions against the persistent attacks of the Muscovites that he attempted to save them by a matrimonial compact, wedding Helena, Ivan's daughter. But the clear determination of Ivan to appropriate as much of Lithuania as possible finally compelled Alexander to take up arms against his father-in-law in 1499. The Lithuanians were routed at the Battle of Vedrosha on 14 July 1500, and in 1503 Alexander was glad to purchase peace by ceding to Ivan Chernihiv, Starodub, Novhorod-Siverskyi, and sixteen other towns.

Legacy

Ivan conquered or brought under his control the lands of north-eastern Rus', marking the beginning of Muscovite dominance over Rus' territory. Ivan arguably became best known for his consolidation of Muscovite rule. His predecessors had increased Moscow's territory from less than 600 square miles under Ivan II (reigned 1353–59) to more than 15,000 square miles at the end of Vasily II's reign. It remained for Ivan III to absorb Moscow's old rivals, Novgorod and Tver, and establish virtually a single rule over what had been appanages of Rus'. Although the circumstances surrounding the acquisitions varied, the results were basically the same: former sovereign or semi-autonomous principalities were reduced to the status of provinces of Moscow, while their princes joined the ranks of the Muscovite service nobility.

After the death of his first wife in 1467, Ivan married (1472) Sophia (Zoë) Palaiologina, a Byzantine princess and niece of the last Byzantine emperor, Constantine XI (killed in battle in 1453). The Vatican sponsored the marriage in hope of bringing Russia under the sway of the Pope and of establishing a broad front against the Turks, a goal that failed. From Ivan's point of view, the marriage fitted well into the general trend of elevating the Muscovite ruler.

Following his second marriage, Ivan developed a complicated court ceremonial on the Byzantine model and began to use the title of "Tsar and Autocrat". Also during the reign of Ivan and his son, Vasily III, Moscow came to be referred to by spokesmen as the Third Rome. Philotheos, a monk from Pskov, developed the idea of Moscow as the true successor to Byzantium and, hence, to Rome.

An impressive building program in Moscow took place under Ivan, directed primarily by Italian artists and craftsmen. New buildings were erected in the Kremlin, and the Kremlin walls were strengthened and furnished with towers and gates. In 1475, Ivan III established the first cannon foundry of Russia in Moscow, which started the native cannon production. Ivan died on 27 October 1505, and was succeeded by his son, Vasily III.

Character 
In Herberstein's Notes on Muscovite Affairs, Ivan III was characterized as a cruel tyrant, drunk, and a misogynist, far from being a ruler of great fairness and equity presented by previous writers.

Further reading on Ivan III
The only biography in English of Ivan is J. L. I. Fennell's Ivan the Great of Moscow (1961). The Third Rome concept is discussed in Nicholas Zernov's Moscow: The Third Rome (1937). A firsthand account of the 1486–1506 period is Baron Sigismund von Herberstein's Notes upon Russia, translated and edited by R. H. Major (2 vols., 1851–1852). The most thorough study of this period available to the English reader is George Vernadsky and Michael Karpovich's A History of Russia, vol. 4 (1959).

Timeline
1462 – Becomes Great Prince after his father's death
1463 – Annexes Yaroslavl
1465 – Sends an expedition to the Arctic
1471 – Invades Novgorod, which becomes a puppet state
1472 – Eldest brother, Yuri, died childless; Ivan seizes his land
1474 – Buys Rostov
1475 – Establishes the first Russian cannon foundry in Moscow.
1476 – Refuses to pay tribute to Khan Ahmed of the Golden Horde
1478 – Annexes the Republic of Novgorod
1480 – Golden Horde advances to the Ugra River but retreats (the last attempt to force Muscovy to pay tribute)
1481 – Younger brother Andrei dies, leaving Ivan his land
1483 – 1st Georgian emissary
1484 – 1st purge of Novgorod
1485 – Annexes Tver. The official date of revival of statehood; an acceptation of new title – 'Grand Prince of All Russia'
1486 – The only autonomous Muscovite prince, Mikhail Andreevich of Vereia dies; Ivan seizes his land.
1487 – Kazan Khanate becomes a Muscovite puppet state
2nd purge of Novgorod
1489 – Annexes Republic of Vyatka
3rd purge of Novgorod: 1,000 expelled.
1491 – Ivan's elder brother Andrei imprisoned for not helping the Crimean Khanate against the Golden Horde
2nd Georgian emissary
1492 – War with Lithuania started August
1493 – Andrei the Elder dies in prison; Ivan seizes his land
1494 – Last brother, Boris, dies and leaves his land to his sons, Ivan and Fedor
February – Lithuanian war ends
Muscovy annexes Vyazma and a sizable region in the upper reaches of the Oka River
1499 – Lithuania invaded. 4,000 troops cross the Pechora River, take 1,000 prisoners, pelts and found Pustozyorsk.
1503 – Ivan takes the land of his nephew Ivan on the latter's death
Chernigov, Starodub, Novgorod-Seversky, and sixteen other towns ceded by Lithuania to Muscovy, ending the war
1505 – Ivan dies, leaving Muscovy to his son Vasili

Marriages and children
1.By Maria of Tver

Ivan Ivanovich (Ivan the Young) (15 February 1458 – 7 March 1490)

2.By Sophia Palaiologina

Anna (b.1474), died in infancy
Elena (b.1475), died in infancy
Feodosia (b.1475-?)
Helena of Moscow (19 May 1476 – 20 January 1513), Grand Duchess of Lithuania and Queen of Poland
Vasily III of Russia (25 March 1479 – 3 December 1533), Grand Prince of Moscow and Grand Prince of all Rus'(Russia) 
Yury Ivanovich (23 March 1480 – 8 March 1536)
Dmitry Ivanovich (6 October 1481 – 14 February 1521)
Eudoxia Ivanovna (1492 – 1513); married Peter (born Kudaikul), son of Ibrahim, Khan of Kazan. Had issue, one daughter: Anastasia Petrovna, wife of Fyodor Mstislavsky, and later of Vasily 'Nemoy' Shuisky. Through her daughter, Anastasia Petrovna, wife of Prince Fyodor Mikhailovich Mstislavsky, Eudoxia is the ancestor of all living members of the House of Galitzin, and of Prince Rostislav Romanov and his siblings.
Feodosia Ivanovna (29 May 1485 – 12 February 1501); married Vasily Danilovich Kholmsky
Simeon Ivanovich (21 March 1487 – 26 June 1518)
Andrey of Staritsa (5 August 1490 – 11 December 1537)

See also
Rulers of Russia family tree

References

Further reading

 Fennell, J. L. I. Ivan the Great of Moscow (1961)
 Grey, Ian. Ivan III and the unification of Russia (1964)
 Ostowski, Donald. "The Growth of Moscovy, (1462–1533)" in Maureen Perrie, ed., The Cambridge History of Russia (2006) vol. I pages 213–39
 Paul, Michael C. "Secular Power and the Archbishops of Novgorod up to the Muscovite Conquest," Kritika  (2007) 8#2 pp:131–170.
 Soloviev, Sergei M. and John J. Windhausen, eds. History of Russia. Vol. 8: Russian Society in the Age of Ivan III (1979)
 Vernadsky, George, and Michael Karpovich, A History of Russia vol. 4 (1959).

Primary sources

External links

Sudebnik

1440 births
1505 deaths
15th-century Grand Princes of Moscow
16th-century Grand Princes of Moscow
15th-century Russian people
16th-century Russian people
Grand Princes of Moscow
Rurik dynasty
Eastern Orthodox monarchs